Karan Nath is an Indian actor. He is best known for his role as the romantic hero in Yeh Dil Aashiqanaa in 2002.

Career
Karan worked as a child artist in Mr India (1987). He made his debut as a leading actor in the 2001 film Paagalpan opposite Aarti Agarwal. In 2002, he starred in the film Yeh Dil Aashiqanaa. He also starred in the erotic thriller Tum - A Dangerous Obsession and the horror thriller Sssshhh..., for which he was nominated in the Stardust Awards 2004. In 2009, Nath appeared in Tera Kya Hoga Johnny which was his last release for a decade. He next appeared in Guns of Banaras, released on 28 February 2020.

In 2021, he participated in Bigg Boss OTT and got evicted within two weeks along with Ridhima Pandit.

Personal life

His father Rakesh Nath is Punjabi and a film producer of Dil Tera Aashiq and many more. His mother Reema Rakesh Nath is Kashmiri and a film writer known for popular film Saajan. His grandfather D. K. Sapru was a well known actor and acted in more than 300 films like Pakeezah, Sahib Bibi Aur Ghulam, Heer Raanjha to name a few.

Filmography

Films

Television

References

External links

Indian male film actors
Living people
Kashmiri Pandits
Male actors in Hindi cinema
Year of birth missing (living people)
Bigg Boss (Hindi TV series) contestants